Ioannis Petridis (18 August 1931 – 6 January 2016) was a Greek economist and politician. He was a member of the New Democracy party. He served as an MP for Pieria from 1985 to 1989. He was born in Katerini.

Petridis died on 6 January 2016 in Athens, aged 84.

References

1931 births
2016 deaths
20th-century Greek economists
Greek MPs 1985–1989
New Democracy (Greece) politicians
People from Katerini